Tench Ringgold (March 3, 1777July 31, 1844) was a businessman and political appointee in Washington, D.C. He was U.S. marshal of the District of Columbia, appointed by President James Monroe (18171825) and serving in the position through 1830, during the first two years of the administration of Andrew Jackson. Ringgold also owned a leather factory and curing shop in Georgetown. He was appointed Treasurer of the Georgetown Savings Institution in what was then a separate jurisdiction later annexed by the District of Columbia.

Ringgold was the son of Mary (Galloway) and Thomas Ringgold, and was from a prominent early-American family that came to the British colonies in the early seventeenth century. He had accompanied James Madison when the president and his cabinet were forced to flee Washington, D.C., during the War of 1812. Afterward, he was named as a member of the Presidential Commission in charge of restoring important Washington buildings after the burning, including the Capitol.

In 1825 he built a house in the capital; it is now known as the Ringgold-Carroll House, referring also to a later resident. The house has been designated as an historic property and is listed on the National Register of Historic Places. Boarders in the house during Ringgold's residency included Supreme Court Justices John Marshall and Joseph Story, both of whom considered Ringgold a friend.

Ringgold married and had a family. Through his daughter Catherine, who married Edward Douglass White Sr., he was the grandfather of Edward Douglass White, who was appointed a Justice of the United States Supreme Court in 1894 and served as Chief Justice from 1910-1921.

Ringgold owned slaves, among them was Thomas H. Ringgold, a Mulatto who was reportedly fathered by Tench. Thomas was born in Maryland and later became a runaway slave. Thomas married Mary E., who was born a free Black. He then made his way to Springfield, Massachusetts via the "underground railroad," circa 1848. There, he became a successful barber in Chicopee, MA. In response to a newspaper notice, he returned to buy his freedom. Using a lawyer in Alexandria, VA, he secured his freedom and returned to Massachusetts. His wife died shortly after childbirth of their daughter, Henrietta B. S. Ringgold. Henrietta died a few months later, that same year. He re-married and moved, leaving his wife and two children in Springfield Cemetery, Massachusetts.

References

1777 births
1844 deaths
People from Washington County, Maryland
United States Marshals
American slave owners
American people of English descent